Rasonic is a brand name under Shun Hing Electric Works and Engineering Co. Ltd, a company that distribute a variety of electronic products.

Description

Under the brand name Rasonic, the company offers a variety of home appliances, such as rice cookers, hair dryers, dehumidifiers, refrigerators, ovens, plasma and LCD televisions, DVD Recorders, kettles, air conditioning units, foot massagers, and vacuum cleaners produced by various OEM manufacturers.

External links
Rasonic website

Electronics companies of Hong Kong
Panasonic Corporation brands